Lukoil Racing team is the leading Russian motorsport organization; its operations including management, driver training and support, engineering expertise and a quality technical environment, which enables continuous development, building, testing and race preparation.

Russian competitions

The team was created in 1997 to participate in the Russian Formula 3 and Tourism-1600 championships. With a European level of organisation and sponsorship from the Lukoil oil company, the team became the main force in the Russian autosport arena. Unfortunately though both series have now ended. Lukoil Racing won 5 of 6 team titles in Russian F3 and 6 of 7 team titles in Supertourism in the seasons it participated in.

In 2003 Lukoil Racing created a junior team for Formula RUS. The team won the title three years in a row, but at the end of 2005 season decided to leave series.

Lukoil Racing easily won drivers and team titles of the Finnish Formula 3 Championship in 2003. In Touring Car racing the team chose to compete in the Honda Civic Cup where it won both titles 3 years in row. Lukoil went back with ArtLine in the Russian Formula 1600 in 2004 and won 3 team titles in a row, but only one drivers title in 2004.

From 2008 Lukoil decide to concentrate only on the RTСC Touring-Light class. The team received Ford Russia manufacturer support and won both the drivers and team titles 4 years in a row. At the end of 2011, the Touring-Light cars were sold. Lukoil Racing went to the RTCC Touring class with manufacturer support of Lada Sport.

WTCC

2009-2011
In 2009 Lukoil's driver Aleksey Dudukalo started to participate in the SEAT León Eurocup with the Sunred team. The year after the Eurocup was folded and Lukoil decided to support Dudukalo and Sunred in the 2011 WTCC season.

2012

On 18 January Lukoil announced that it had decided to participate in the 2012 WTCC season, running its own team with Gabriele Tarquini and Aleksey Dudukalo as drivers. Tarquini won 1 race and finished 4th in the championship. The team won the Yokohama Teams' Trophy.

2013
In 2013 Lukoil Racing became a manufacturer team supported by Lada Sport. The first seat was taken by Lada's driver James Thompson. Dudukalo was replaced with Mikhail Kozlovskiy after a crash during Round 1 qualification.

Sponsorship

Formula 3000

At the end of 1998 Lukoil Racing decided to participate in the International Formula 3000 Championship with its own team, including current Russian F3 drivers Alberto Pedemonte and Viktor Maslov. But Lukoil was late with 1999 season participation request and bought Christian Horner's Arden International team. The team was renamed to Lukoil Arden Racing and also started to participate in the Italian Formula 3000 series. After scoring no points in 1999 season the team was renamed to Arden Team Russia with Lukoil logotypes being replaced by the inscription РОССИЯ (Russia). In mid-2001 Arden was sold back to Horner.

Drivers support program

In 2003 Lukoil Racing decided to create a Drivers support program to promote Russian drivers on the international racing arena. It's Lukoil's arm of the Red Bull Junior Team.

The Program started with Mikhail Aleshin in the Formula Renault 2000 Eurocup and other young drivers in Formula RUS. Lukoil Racing had its own team in Formula Renault 2000 but later it was just a sponsor for other teams. Sometimes Lukoil drivers were also part of Red Bull Junior Team (Aleshin, Kvyat). From 2006 Lukoil started to support Ukrainian, Finnish and Swedish drivers and later started to support not only young drivers but more experienced drivers.

References

External links
  

Russian auto racing teams
Auto racing teams established in 1997
1997 establishments in Russia
World Touring Car Championship teams
Formula Renault Eurocup teams
Italian Formula 3 teams